Qareh Mohammadlu (also Romanized as Qareh Moḩammadlū; also known as Qarā Moḩammad, Qarā Moḩammadlū, Qara Muhammad, and Qareh Moḩammad) is a village in Gorgin Rural District, Korani District, Bijar County, Kurdistan Province, Iran. At the 2006 census, its population was 117, in 25 families. The village is populated by Azerbaijanis.

References 

Towns and villages in Bijar County
Azerbaijani settlements in Kurdistan Province